John Newcombe defeated Clark Graebner 6–4, 6–4, 8–6 in the final to win the men's singles title at the 1967 U.S. National Championships.

Seeds
The seeded players are listed below. John Newcombe is the champion; others show the round in which they were eliminated.
  John Newcombe (champion)
  Roy Emerson (quarterfinals)
 n/a
  Nikola Pilić (third round)
  Cliff Drysdale (second round)
  Roger Taylor (second round)
  Clark Graebner (finalist)
  Charlie Pasarell (third round)

Draw

Key
 Q = Qualifier
 WC = Wild card
 LL = Lucky loser
 r = Retired

Final eight

Earlier rounds

Section 1

Section 2

Section 3

Section 4

Section 5

Section 6

Section 7

Section 8

References

External links
 1967 U.S. National Championships on ITFtennis.com, the source for this draw
 Association of Tennis Professionals (ATP) – 1967 U.S. Championships Men's Singles draw

U.S. National Championships (tennis) by year – Men's singles
Mens Singles